The ASUN Conference men's basketball tournament (formerly known as the Trans America Athletic Conference men's basketball tournament between 1979 and 2001) is the conference championship tournament in basketball for the ASUN Conference, formerly known as the Trans America Athletic Conference (TAAC) and Atlantic Sun Conference. The tournament has been held every year since 1979, except for 1992–93.

It is a single-elimination tournament and seeding is based on regular season records. The winner, declared conference champion, receives the conference's automatic bid to the NCAA men's basketball tournament, as long as it is eligible for NCAA-sponsored postseason play. The eligibility issue applied in both 2021 and 2022, with each final featuring a team representing a transitional member of Division I (North Alabama in 2021 and Bellarmine in 2022). Under NCAA rules, a school transitioning from NCAA Division II is not eligible for NCAA-sponsored D-I postseason play (either the NCAA tournament or the NIT) during its four-year transitional period. North Alabama began its transition in July 2018 and was thus ineligible for the NCAA tournament or NIT through the 2021–22 season; Bellarmine began its transition in July 2020 and is thus ineligible for said events through 2023–24. Should a transitional school win the tournament, ASUN rules call for the regular-season champion to receive the automatic bid. North Alabama lost its final, making the issue moot for 2021, but Bellarmine won in 2022, giving Jacksonville State that season's automatic bid.

History

Trans America Athletic Conference

Atlantic Sun/ASUN Conference

Broadcasters

Performance by school

Teams in bold are ASUN members as of the current 2022–23 NCAA basketball season
 Among other current ASUN members:
 Jacksonville, North Alabama, and Stetson have advanced to the tournament final but have yet to win a championship.
 Austin Peay, Central Arkansas, Eastern Kentucky, Jacksonville State, and Kennesaw State have yet to advance to the tournament final. Jacksonville State had been a TAAC/ASUN member from 1995 to 2003 before rejoining in 2021, but will leave again in 2023 to join Conference USA. Kennesaw State will leave for Conference USA in 2024.

Footnotes

See also
 ASUN women's basketball tournament

References

 
Recurring sporting events established in 1979